Tomasa Ana Núñez Abreu (17 April 1951 – 30 December 1981) was a Cuban track and field athlete who competed in the javelin throw. She was Cuba's first gold medallist in the javelin at the Pan American Games, gaining that title in 1971. She won four titles at regional level at the Central American and Caribbean Games in 1970 and 1974, as well as being the 1971 and 1973 champion at the Central American and Caribbean Championships in Athletics.

Career
Born in Yaguajay, Cuba to Juan Núñez and Dominga Abreu, she was the fifth of nine children. Núñez decided to take up athletics in her early teenage years and quickly emerged as a quality thrower with a gold medal at the 1966 Cuban National Scholastic Games after training in Cienfuegos at the School for Student Sport Development (Escuela de Iniciación Deportiva Escolar).

Her first major medal came at age eighteen at the 1969 Central American and Caribbean Championships in Athletics, which was held in Havana that year. She took the silver medal behind fellow Cuban Milagros Bayard. Núñez quickly became a dominant force in women's javelin in the region. This was a Panamerican record at the time, marking her as the best women's thrower in the Americas.

Núñez confirmed her place at the top of the region with two major victories in 1971. Dominance over the best American throwers followed a month later at the 1971 Pan American Games: a games record of  left her comfortably as the gold medallist ahead of Sherry Calvert and Roberta Brown. This achievement made her Cuba's first ever Pan American javelin champion of either sex. Her victory marked the beginning of a long period of success of Cuban women in the event, with María Caridad Colón, Ivonne Leal, Dulce García, Xiomara Rivero and Osleidys Menéndez keeping the title in Cuban hands from 1979 to 1999. Colón and Menéndez built upon Núñez's legacy by raising it to a global level, becoming Olympic champions.

She did not compete at the 1972 Summer Olympics, but continued her success by defending her two regional titles. She bested Bayard again at the 1973 Central American and Caribbean Championships in Athletics, then narrowly defeated yet another Cuban María Beltrán to win the Central American and Caribbean Games in 1974. Beltrán and Colón were the ones to later succeed Núñez to those titles. The women's javelin title remained with Cuba from 1967 to 1987 at the CAC Championships while the CAC Games women's javelin was an exclusively Cuba affair for even longer, from 1962 to 1998.

She retired from the sport in 1976, having fallen down the national rankings and placed third at the Copa Cuba meet. She took up javelin coaching afterwards in Havana. She married Roberto Lammoglia Castillo and the couple had their first child, a daughter, Yisel Lammoglia, in 1977. Núñez died of a sudden illness in 1981 at the age of thirty and was buried at  Cementerio de Colón. She was awarded the Order of Ana Betancourt medal by the Federation of Cuban Women in honour of her achievements.

International competitions

References

1951 births
1981 deaths
People from Yaguajay
Cuban female javelin throwers
Pan American Games gold medalists for Cuba
Pan American Games medalists in athletics (track and field)
Athletes (track and field) at the 1971 Pan American Games
Central American and Caribbean Games gold medalists for Cuba
Competitors at the 1970 Central American and Caribbean Games
Competitors at the 1974 Central American and Caribbean Games
Central American and Caribbean Games medalists in athletics
Medalists at the 1971 Pan American Games
20th-century Cuban women